Inna Mikolaevna Cherniak (born 26 March 1988) is a Ukrainian judo and sambo practitioner.

Career
Despite being visually impaired from birth she competes both against sighted and visually impaired people. Her twin sister Maryna is not visually impaired and takes part in regular judo tournaments. To avoid competing against each other the sisters often split the events. For example, at the 2013 World Championships, Inna competed in the 52 kg and Maryna in the 48 kg division. At the 2013 Universiade, both sisters won medals in the 52 kg category, but Inna in sambo and Maryna in judo. In 2016, Inna won a gold medal in judo at the 2016 Summer Paralympics, while Maryna was eliminated in her second bout at the 2016 Summer Olympics.

References

External links
 

1988 births
Living people
Ukrainian female judoka
Paralympic judoka of Ukraine
Judoka at the 2016 Summer Paralympics
Paralympic gold medalists for Ukraine
Twin sportspeople
Ukrainian twins
Judoka at the 2015 European Games
European Games medalists in judo
European Games gold medalists for Ukraine
Medalists at the 2016 Summer Paralympics
Universiade silver medalists for Ukraine
Paralympic medalists in judo
21st-century Ukrainian women